Marco Antonio Campeggi (died 1553) was a Roman Catholic prelate who served as Bishop of Grosseto (1528–1553).

Biography 
On 23 March 1528, Marco Antonio Campeggi was appointed during the papacy of Pope Clement VII as Bishop of Grosseto.
He served as Bishop of Grosseto until his death in 7 May 1553.

References

Sources

External links
 (for Chronology of Bishops) 
 (for Chronology of Bishops)  

16th-century Italian Roman Catholic bishops
Bishops appointed by Pope Clement VII
Bishops of Grosseto
1553 deaths